"Good Bye, Radar" is a two-part episode of the television series M*A*S*H that served as the fourth and fifth episodes of the show's eighth season and the 177th and 178th episodes of the series. Part 1 aired on October 8, 1979, with Part 2 airing one week later. The two episodes aired as a one-hour special during off-season reruns on May 12, 1980. As the title of the episode implies, these were the final two episodes to feature Gary Burghoff in his role as Corporal Radar O'Reilly.

These episodes were originally intended to be aired as season seven's finale, but CBS and the producers convinced Burghoff to return for the beginning of season eight. To make up for his imminent departure, Burghoff received a special credit in the opening of the first six episodes of the season, immediately following William Christopher's, which read "also starring Gary Burghoff as Radar". For the first three episodes of season eight, Burghoff’s absence was explained by Radar’s having been sent to Tokyo for some R&R. In two of the three episodes, Burghoff made cameo appearances.

In addition to Burghoff’s departure, these episodes marked the final appearance of Johnny Haymer in his role as Staff Sergeant Zelmo Zale. With the departure of Radar, Hawkeye Pierce, Margaret Houlihan, and Father Mulcahy were the only three characters left on the series who had any connection to the novel and film from which M*A*S*H was derived (with Henry Blake being killed off at the end of season three, Trapper John McIntyre discharged between seasons three and four, and Frank Burns being sent back to the States after indecent conduct on R&R following Major Houlihan's marriage, at the start of season six).

Synopsis

Part 1
A typical night in the 4077th OR is underway, with the surgeons hard at work on patients. Something goes wrong, however, when the camp's primary generator goes out. Hawkeye gets his finger jammed in a rib spreader, severely spraining it.

Meanwhile, Klinger, who is the acting company clerk, goes outside to find out what's wrong with the generator. Seeing his rival Sergeant Zale at the controls, Klinger instantly assumes Zale doesn't know what he's doing and goes to crank up the camp's backup generator- only to find that it's been stolen. The primary generator then blows out, leaving the M*A*S*H without power.

With the unit's power now completely gone, two concerns become immediate: a patient of B.J. Hunnicutt's, who has a stomach problem (which they fix by using an old style suction machine developed by Dr. Owen Wangensteen), and what to do with all the food in the camp (which Col. Potter fixes by having a smorgasbord for all the people in the area).

Meanwhile, Radar is about set to return from his R&R in Tokyo, but has been bumped from his scheduled flight by a general's cardboard cutout. During his wait for his plane, he meets an attractive nurse, who is going home to Lancaster, Missouri. Hearing that, and noticing that she is not too far from the same area of the U.S. as he is, Radar and the nurse instantly hit it off. However, before they can get anywhere, Radar is placed on another flight, and despite his arguing with the officer in charge of booking, has to leave.  He tells the nurse that they should try to find each other when they get home.  After a goodbye kiss, Radar is off, back to the 4077th.

After getting bumped from a jeep by some stranded GIs and having to ride back to the 4077th in an ox-drawn cart, Radar returns, tired and hungry, to a huge ovation from the people in the camp- especially Klinger, who has been waiting for Radar to return more than anyone. Immediately the camp wants Radar to find a generator, but Radar doesn't want to right away, wanting a shower and a meal. After some cajoling, Radar finally agrees to search for a generator, only to find the same luck that Klinger has had...no generators to be found.

Later that night, while Radar is drowning his sorrows in the officers' club with his favorite Grape Nehi, Col. Potter enters the swamp with tragic news -- Radar's Uncle Ed, who had been helping his mother run their farm in Iowa for many years, has died. After breaking the news to Radar, who is trying to cope with it while also doing his job, Col. Potter tells Radar that he needs to go home to help his mother, and to get a DA-7 Hardship Discharge form for himself and fill it out. Hawkeye and B.J. congratulate Radar on going home, and Radar is happy too...he thinks.

Part 2
The next day begins with Klinger desperately trying to get Radar to help him find a generator and get the office back in shape. Radar, however, does not want to hear it. He tells Klinger that no one helped him when he first became company clerk, and Klinger was going to have to learn on his own. Finally, Radar does help Klinger try and con a generator out of someone (with some help from Major Winchester, who convinces Radar to help Klinger). Although Radar is unsuccessful in getting a generator, incoming wounded inspires Radar to order a bunch of jeeps and trucks to come to the 4077th- resulting in outdoor surgery, by headlights!

After that, and seeing Hawkeye operate with his injured finger (which still is bothering him), Radar decides to fight his discharge, claiming that he is more needed at the 4077th. After getting into an argument with Hawkeye, Radar still refuses to change his mind.

In one final attempt to secure a generator, Klinger gets a call from a supply sergeant at "I" Corps saying they have a generator available.  Klinger takes a case of Scotch whiskey to I Corps to close the deal.  At that point, a major from a service-and-supply unit pulls up and demands the generator, saying that two other generators they tried to secure at I Corps were stolen.  It is at that point where Klinger learns what happened to the 4077th's auxiliary generator- the major took it for his unit! Klinger decides that payback is in order.  While the major and supply sergeant go fill out a requisition, Klinger himself goes to the supply central issue station, poses as the major's driver, and blackmails the dispatcher into giving him the generator without a requisition. Returning to the 4077th with it, Klinger is met with a heroes' welcome. Radar now realizes that the camp can survive without him if they need to, and he finally decides to go home.

Radar says his good-byes to everyone in triage after a party for him goes awry due to wounded on the compound, and is saluted by Hawkeye while he watches the 4077th doctors in the OR from the hallway one final time.

After the OR session, Hawkeye and B.J. return to the Swamp to find something on Hawkeye's bed...Radar's teddy bear, which he had kept with him throughout the war as a security item. It's taken as a sign that Radar has officially grown up and become a man.

Production notes
The first cast member to be hired for M*A*S*H, Gary Burghoff became the last to leave, following the departures of McLean Stevenson and Wayne Rogers in 1975 and Larry Linville in 1977. He would later reprise his role as Radar twice; one was in a 2-part episode of AfterMASH, and the other was in an unsold TV pilot W*A*L*T*E*R, which featured Radar as a rookie police officer in St. Louis.
In the episode "War of Nerves," Sidney Freedman correctly predicted that Radar would leave his teddy bear behind in Korea when he went home.

References

M*A*S*H (season 8) episodes
1979 American television episodes